Wang Hongni (born March 9, 1982 in Jinan, Shandong) is a female Chinese triathlete. Wang competed at the second Olympic triathlon at the 2004 Summer Olympics. She took fortieth place with a total time of 2:18:40.07.

She won gold at the 2006 Asian Games in Doha in the triathlon event.

References

External links 
  (archive)
 
 
 
 

1982 births
Living people
Chinese female triathletes
Olympic triathletes of China
Triathletes at the 2004 Summer Olympics
Asian Games medalists in triathlon
Asian Games gold medalists for China
Triathletes at the 2006 Asian Games
Medalists at the 2006 Asian Games
Doping cases in triathlon
Sportspeople from Jinan
20th-century Chinese women
21st-century Chinese women